is a Japanese professional footballer who plays for Qatar Stars League club Al-Rayyan and the Japan national team.

Career
Born in Kumamoto, Kumamoto Prefecture, Japan. Taniguchi begin first youth career with Tsukuba University.

Taniguchi begin first professional career with Kawasaki Frontale in 2014. He lift the J1 Trophy for  four times in 2017, 2018, 2020 and 2021 respectively. He announced leave from the club after nine years at Kawasaki in 2022 season.

On 28 December 2022, Taniguchi joined to Qatari club, Al Rayyan for during mid 2022–23 season.

International career
On 7 May 2015, Japan's coach Vahid Halilhodžić called him for a two-days training camp. On 23 July 2015, he was called again for 2015 EAFF East Asian Cup. He was called again for 2022 World Cup.

Career statistics

Club

International 
Appearances and goals by national team and year

Honours
Kawasaki Frontale
J1 League: 2017, 2018, 2020, 2021
Emperor's Cup: 2020
J.League Cup: 2019
Japanese Super Cup: 2019, 2021
Individual
J.League Best XI: 2018, 2020, 2021, 2022

References

External links
 
 

1991 births
Living people
University of Tsukuba alumni
Association football people from Kumamoto Prefecture
Japanese footballers
Japan international footballers
Japanese expatriate footballers
J1 League players
Kawasaki Frontale players
Association football midfielders
Universiade gold medalists for Japan
Universiade medalists in football
Medalists at the 2011 Summer Universiade
Medalists at the 2013 Summer Universiade
2022 FIFA World Cup players
Expatriate footballers in Qatar
Japanese expatriate sportspeople in Qatar